Unang Hirit is a Philippine television news broadcasting and talk show broadcast by GMA Network. It is the longest running morning show in the Philippines. Originally hosted by Ryan Agoncillo, Lyn Ching-Pascual, Arnold Clavio, Suzi Entrata, Mickey Ferriols, and Miriam Quiambao, it premiered on December 6, 1999 on the network's morning line up replacing Mornings @ GMA. Ching-Pascual, Clavio, Nathaniel "Mang Tani" Cruz, Susan Enriquez, Entrata, Ivan Mayrina, and Mariz Umali currently serve as the hosts.

Overview
Unang Hirit premiered on GMA Network on December 6, 1999, replacing Mornings @ GMA. Ryan Agoncillo, Lyn Ching, Arnold Clavio, Suzi Entrata, Mickey Ferriols and Miriam Quiambao served the show as the original hosts.

On July 15, 2002, the news broadcasting segment Unang Balita debuted. On April 11, 2011, Edu Manzano returned to the show. A day later, Lhar Santiago accidentally broke his right arm and his injured right eyebrow during the show's segment Tumbang Preso. On October 22, 2012, Jun Veneracion joined the show. Ivan Mayrina also regularly joined the show and introduced as one of the anchors of Unang Balita. 

On July 31, 2019, Rhea Santos announced her departure from the show to migrate in Canada. Santos was replaced by Mariz Umali in August 2019. In March 2020, the production was halted due to the enhanced community quarantine in Luzon caused by the COVID-19 pandemic. The show resumed its programming on April 13, 2020. 

On February 28, 2023, Connie Sison left the show to focus on her family and health.

Hosts

 Arnold Clavio 
 Suzi Entrata-Abrera 
 Lyn Ching-Pascual 
 Susan Enriquez 
 Ivan Mayrina 
 Nathaniel "Mang Tani" Cruz 
 Mariz Umali 

Recurring hosts
 Gaby Concepcion 
 Winnie Monsod 
 Regine Tolentino 
 Juancho Trivino 
 Phytos Ramirez 
 John Philip Balang Bughaw 
 Boobay 
 Klea Pineda 
 Joyce Pring 
 Clint Bondad 
 Donita Nose 
 Krissy 
 Yuan Francisco 
 Angelica Ulip 
 Leanne Bautista 
 Chef Jose Sarasola 
 Shaira Diaz 
 Kaloy Tingcungo 
 Chef JR Royol 
 Roxie Smith 
 Jenzel Angeles 
 Rabiya Mateo 
 Ashley Rivera 
 Anjay Anson 
 Kim Perez 
Former hosts
 Ryan Agoncillo 
 Mickey Ferriols 
 Mon Isberto 
 Miriam Quiambao 
 Eagle Riggs 
 Martin Andanar 
 TJ Manotoc 
 Arn-Arn 
 Lhar Santiago 
 Love Añover 
 Luane Dy 
 Rhea Santos 
 Hans Montenegro 
 Daniel Razon 
 Pia Arcangel 
 Atom Araullo 
 Edu Manzano 
 Tessa Nieto 
 Drew Arellano 
 Diana Zubiri 
 Jolina Magdangal 
 Oscar Oida 
 Paolo Bediones 
 Sunshine Dizon 
 Nikki Dacullo 
 Monica Verallo 
 Connie Sison 
 Tonipet Gaba 
 Jun Veneracion 
 Mikael Daez 
 Hiro Peralta 

Former segment hosts
 Jackie Lou Blanco 
 Cory Quirino
 Luchi Cruz-Valdes
 Oscar Orbos
 Bea Binene
 Manny Calayan
 Pie Calayan
 Kat Manalo
 Fanny Serrano
 Olen Juarez-Lim
 Connie Sison

Segments
 All Prize Hike
 All Access Pass
 Bantay Presyo
 Boses ng Masa
 Buena Manong Balita
 Cash Word
 Cash Alarm
 Cash-Sagot
 I.M. Ready, GMA Weather
 Hirit ni Mareng Winnie
Hirit Pa More ni Mareng Winnie
 Hirit Trapiko
 Kapuso sa Batas
 Kapuso sa Kalusugan
 Kitchen Hirit
 #LagotCam
 People, Places, and Events
 Ronda Reports
 Sala ni Igan, Sala ni Susan
 Senior Moment
 Showbiz Hirit / Showbiz Bullets
 Siyanse ni Susan
 Sparkada
 Talakayan with Igan
 Top Hirits
 Unang Ratsada
 News Reels
 UH Barangay Blowout
 UB Express
 UB Express: Overseas
 UH Game
 UH Online Sikat
 UH Plantitas
 UH Serbisyong Totoo
 UH Summer Outing
 UH Funliner
 UH Shoutout
 UH ATM Agunalido Teller Machine
 UH Records
 UH Sorpresa Drop
 Unang Balita
 Breaking News
 #DashCam
 Hirit Good Vibes
 Huli Cam
 Lodi Noypi
 Ronda Probinsya
 Traffic Hirit
 Sports Hirit
 UB Explainer
 UB Express Overseas
 Unang Chika
 Unang Ronda

Accolades

References

External links
 
 

1999 Philippine television series debuts
Breakfast television in the Philippines
Filipino-language television shows
GMA Network news shows
GMA Integrated News and Public Affairs shows
Philippine television news shows
Television productions suspended due to the COVID-19 pandemic
Sign language television shows